Fort Griswold is a former American defensive fortification in Groton, Connecticut named after Deputy Governor Matthew Griswold. The fort played a key role in the early stages of the American Revolutionary War, in correspondence with Fort Trumbull on the opposite side of the Thames River. Griswold defended the port of New London, Connecticut, a supply center for the Continental Army and friendly port for Connecticut-sanctioned privateers who attacked British ships. The 17-acre site is maintained as Fort Griswold Battlefield State Park by the Connecticut Department of Energy and Environmental Protection.

History
Construction of the fort was begun on December 5, 1775 in response to the outbreak of the American Revolutionary War. It was completed in 1778 and was also called Groton Fort. It is located on a hill with the ability to bombard ships entering the Thames River. About 100 feet below the main fort is a battery for additional guns which was built during the Revolutionary War and improved in the late 19th century.

In September 1781, British troops under Benedict Arnold raided and burned New London. The British were well informed of the layout of Fort Griswold, and Arnold approached the river from such an angle that its guns could not engage his fleet. The British forces divided, some to burn New London and the rest to attack the fort in the Battle of Groton Heights. The British eventually broke into the fort, and Colonel William Ledyard surrendered by handing his sword hilt-first to the commanding British officer—who took it and thrust it through Colonel Ledyard. Arnold abandoned the fort soon after and left New London in flames.

Later use
The fort was rebuilt and manned in several other conflicts, but the Battle of Groton Heights was its most prominent use. It was used during the War of 1812 by sailors commanded by Commodore Stephen Decatur when Decatur's three-ship squadron was blockaded by a larger British force in 1814. In the 1840s, the fort's lower battery was rebuilt for 20 guns, initially 32-pounder and 24-pounder cannons.

After the American Civil War, the lower battery was redesigned to mount 10-inch Rodman guns. It was a sub-post of Fort Trumbull for most of its use by the Army, although it was never actively garrisoned after the Civil War and had an ordnance sergeant as caretaker. It was in the care of Ordnance Sergeant Mark Wentworth Smith from 1863 to 1879, a Mexican–American War veteran who was wounded at the Battle of Chapultepec. Sergeant Smith died in 1879 at age 76, the oldest active duty enlisted soldier in the history of the Army. Fort Griswold became obsolete after the Spanish–American War, when Fort H. G. Wright was completed in 1906 on Fishers Island as part of the Harbor Defenses of Long Island Sound.

State park

The State of Connecticut has owned and operated the site as Fort Griswold Battlefield State Park since 1953. This includes the restored earthwork battery, cannons, and a shot furnace and powder magazine. The grounds include several monuments and memorials to state residents who fought in different wars:
 The Groton Monument is a granite obelisk dedicated to the defenders who fell during the Battle of Groton Heights.
 The adjacent Monument House Museum features exhibits about the Revolutionary War and is operated by the Daughters of the American Revolution. Visitors can climb the monument and visit the museum from Memorial Day through Labor Day. 
The Ebenezer Avery House sheltered the wounded after the Battle of Groton Heights. It is a Revolutionary-period historic house museum that is open for tours on summer weekends.

See also

National Register of Historic Places listings in New London County, Connecticut

References

External links

Fort Griswold Battlefield State Park Connecticut Department of Energy and Environmental Protection
Friends of Fort Griswold

Griswold
Griswold
State parks of Connecticut
Tourist attractions in New London County, Connecticut
Closed installations of the United States Army
Griswold
Museums in New London County, Connecticut
American Revolutionary War museums in Connecticut
Buildings and structures in Groton, Connecticut
Protected areas of New London County, Connecticut
Griswold
National Register of Historic Places in New London County, Connecticut
American Revolution on the National Register of Historic Places
Military installations established in 1775
1775 establishments in Connecticut
Military installations closed in 1906
1906 disestablishments in Connecticut